Pamela Jung (born July 3, 1963) is an American former professional tennis player.

Jung grew up in California as one of four tennis playing siblings, coached by their father Eugene. The Jungs were the "USTA Tennis Family of the Year" in 1984. One of her brothers, Steven, made the title match at the 1989 NCAA Division I singles championships and competed professionally.

A two-time All-American for Pepperdine University, Jung has the distinction of being the first player from the school to receive this honor (in 1983). Jung, who had a career high ranking of 215 on the professional tour, qualified for the main draw of the 1988 Australian Open. Her best performance on the WTA Tour came at the 1988 Auckland Open, where she beat sixth seed Elizabeth Minter en route to the third round.

ITF finals

Singles: 2 (0–2)

Doubles: 2 (2–0)

References

External links
 
 

1963 births
Living people
American female tennis players
Pepperdine Waves women's tennis players
Tennis people from California
20th-century American women
21st-century American women